The Czechoslovakia national handball team was the national handball team of Czechoslovakia.

The 1964 World Men's Handball Championship was the fifth team handball World Championship. It was held in Czechoslovakia.
The 1990 World Men's Handball Championship was the 12th team handball World Championship. It was held in Czechoslovakia from February 28 to March 10, 1990.

Former national handball teams
Handball